Witizla, who possibly was the founder of Slavnik's dynasty was with Spytihněv I, when Bohemians came to the Roman Empire from Great Moravia. This was the last time in Bohemian history when there were groups of princes like Bohemians, Lemuzes, Lucans or Zlicans.

Slavník dynasty